The Canarian shrew (Crocidura canariensis) is a species of mammal in the family Soricidae. It is endemic to the Canary Islands, specifically the eastern islands of Lanzarote, Fuerteventura, Lobos, and Mount Clara. It used to be found on Graciosa, Canary Islands and Alegranza.  Its natural habitat is subtropical or tropical dry shrubland. It is threatened by habitat loss.

References

External links

Crocidura
Mammals of the Canary Islands
Endangered animals
Endangered biota of Africa
Mammals described in 1987
Taxonomy articles created by Polbot